Edward Joseph Egan  (born 6 July 1932) is an Australian folk musician and a former public servant who served as Administrator of the Northern Territory from 2003 to 2007.

Early life
Egan was born in Coburg, Victoria, and was educated at Parade College. He moved to the Northern Territory in 1949 at the age of 16 in search of work and adventure. In his early career with the Department of Aboriginal Affairs he was mainly in the bush and engaged in jobs such as stockwork and crocodile hunting while employed as a patrol officer and reserve superintendent. Later he was a teacher at bush schools. He was a member of the first National Reconciliation Council.

Egan was the sole teacher at the Newcastle Waters Station in 1965 and was stranded at the property for six weeks when the creek flooded. During this time, no supplies were able to be delivered, so Egan had to hunt for animals such as bush turkey for food. He later returned to the station in 2012 for the book launch of Middle of Everywhere about life in the area.

Music career 
Egan began recording in 1969 with "Drinkers of the Northern Territory" and has released 30 albums, mostly themed around outback life, history and Aboriginal people.

Egan wrote the "Gurindji Blues" in 1969 with Vincent Lingiari during the Wave Hill walk-off. Egan says he was moved to write "Gurindji Blues" after he heard Peter Nixon, then Minister for the Interior, say in parliament that if the Gurindji wanted land, they should save up and buy it, like any other Australian. Nixon also gets a mention in the song.

Albums
{| class="wikitable plainrowheaders" style="text-align:center;"
|+ List of albums
! scope="col" rowspan="1" style="width:14em;"| Title
! scope="col" rowspan="1" style="width:20em;"| Album details
|-
! scope="row"| Outback Australia
|
 Released: 1972
 Label: RCA (SL 101976)
 Formats: LP
|-
! scope="row"| The Bangtail Muster
|
 Released: 1973
 Label: RCA (SL 102350)
 Formats: LP, Cassette
|-
! scope="row"| Once a Jolly Swagman
|
 Released: 1974
 Label: RCA Australia (VPL1-0049)
 Formats: LP, Cassette
|-
! scope="row"| Beyond the Black Stump
|
 Released: 1975
 Label: RCA Victor (VPL1-0113)
 Formats: LP, Cassette
|-
! scope="row"| The Bush Races
|
 Released: 1976
 Label: RCA Victor (VPL1-0139)
 Formats: LP, Cassette
|-
! scope="row"| Rodeo Australia
|
 Released: 1980
 Label: RCA Australia (VPL1 0286)
 Formats: LP, Cassette
|-
! scope="row"| A Town Like Alice
|
 Released: 1980
 Label: RCA Australia (VPL1 0313)
 Formats: LP, Cassette
|-
! scope="row"| Arnhem Land Lullaby
|
 Released: 1981
 Label: RCA Rockaway (DPL-610)
 Formats: LP, Cassette
|-
! scope="row"| The Overlanders
|
 Released: 1982
 Label: Faces of Australia Series, ABC Records (TELP 1001)
 Formats: LP, Cassette
|-
! scope="row"| Our Coach Captain
|
 Released: 1983
 Label: EMI 
 Formats: LP, Cassette
|-
! scope="row"| The Shearers
|
 Released: 1984
 Label: Faces of Australia Series, ABC Records (TELP 1002)
 Formats: LP, Cassette
|-
! scope="row"|  The Anzacs  (with Judy Small, Eric Bogle, Nerys Evans and the Anzac Band & Singers)
|
 Released: 1985
 Label: Faces of Australia Series, ABC Records (TELP 1003)
 Formats: LP, Cassette
|-
! scope="row"| My Australia: The Very Best of Ted Egan
|
 Released: 1986
 Label: J&B Records (JB 248)
 Formats: LP, Cassette
 Compilation
|-
! scope="row"| The Aboriginals
|
 Released: 1987
 Label: Faces of Australia Series, ABC Records (TELP 1004)
 Formats: LP, Cassette
|-
! scope="row"| The Convicts
|
 Released: 1989
 Label: Faces of Australia Series, ABC Records (TELP 1005)
 Formats: LP, Cassette
|-
! scope="row"| This Land Australia
|
 Released: 1989
 Label: EMI (EMX 793212)
 Formats: LP, Cassette
|-
! scope="row"| Echoes in the Dust  (with Andrew Langford)
|
 Released: 1989
 Label: The Original Dreamtime Art Gallery 
 Formats: Cassette
|-
! scope="row"| Welcome to the Bush
|
 Released: 1994
 Label: Castle Communications
 Formats: CD
|-
! scope="row"| The Urupunga Frog (Australian Songs for Children)|
 Released: 1999
 Label: 
 Formats: CD
|-
! scope="row"| Packhorse Drover  (with Bruce Simpson)
|
 Released: 2000
 Label: ABC Audio (0642557020)
 Formats: CD
|-
! scope="row"| The Drover's Boy - A Celebration of Australian Women  (with Nerys Evans)
|
 Released: 2002
 Formats: CD
|-
! scope="row"| I.O.U|
 Released: 2002
 Formats: CD
|-
! scope="row"| The Land Downunder|
 Released: 2003
 Label: Evergreen Media (EVGR 002)
 Formats: 2×CD, digital
|-
! scope="row"| Such Is Life|
 Released: 2003
 Label: EMI Music Distribution 
 Formats: CD, digital
|-

! scope="row"| Saving the Best|
 Released: August 2010
 Label: ABC
 Formats: CD, digital
|-
|}

Charting singles

Books

1978 Outback Holiday (also by Mark Egan) 
1984 The Overlanders Songbook 
1987 The Aboriginals Songbook -Faces of Australia Series ASIN B000N7AKU0
1989 Shearers Songbook 
1991 Would I Lie to You? The Goanna Driver and Other Very True Stories 
1993 The Paperboys War Ted Egan An Autobiography 
1996 Justice All Their Own 
1997 Sitdown Up North Ted Egan An Autobiography 
1997 A Drop of Rough Ted 
1997 The Drover's Boy 
2003 The Land Downunder 
2008 Due Inheritance 
2011 Kutju Australia: An Australian Translation of Advance Australia Fair 
2014 The ANZACS 100 Years On: in Story and Song 
2019 Outback Songman: My Life 

Videos
 This Land Australia series (as presenter, narrator and interviewer)Broome and the Pearl CoastCape York Peninsula: The Vanishing FrontierCentral Australia: The Eighth WonderDiscovering a RainforestGulf Country: The Road from Mt. SurpriseHahndorf and the Barossa: Valleys of HopeThe Islands of Torres StraitMysterious AustraliaNorfolk IslandPaddleboats of the Murray RiverRailways of YesteryearSnowy MountainsThese are available individually and as boxed sets on DVD from Flashback Entertainment.

Administrator of the Northern Territory
Egan was appointed Administrator of the Northern Territory by Governor-General Michael Jeffery effective 31 October 2003. He was sworn in on 18 November.

On 14 September 2005, he was awarded a one-year extension to his term of office by Jim Lloyd, the Federal Minister for Local Government, Territories and Roads. This was further extended for another year to serve until 30 October 2007.

 Television 
Egan has presented and narrated 6 episodes of the 1989 series This Land Australia, a series devoted to iconic Australian people and places. He also wrote and performed the show's theme song of the same name. He has been a co-host of the lifestyle show The Great Outdoors.

Honours
Egan was made a Member of the Order of Australia (AM) in the 1993 Australia Day Honours List for services to the Aboriginal people, and for "an ongoing contribution to the literary heritage of Australia through song and verse".

In 2004, Egan was promoted to an Officer of the Order (AO) as acknowledgement of "the significance of [his] continuing contribution to the community culminating in his being sworn-in as the 18th Administrator of the Northern Territory".

Egan is listed among the "Australia's National Living Treasures" by the National Trust of Australia.

Ted was the recipient of the National Folk Festival's Lifetime Achievement Award in April 2015 at NFF's Opening Ceremony in Canberra. Egan performed four songs at the event, including one about pioneering women in Australia.

ARIA Music Awards
The ARIA Music Awards are a set of annual ceremonies presented by Australian Recording Industry Association (ARIA), which recognise excellence, innovation, and achievement across all genres of the music of Australia. They commenced in 1987. 

! 
|-
| 1990 || This Land Australia'' || ARIA Award for Best Country Album ||  ||

Australian Roll of Renown
The Australian Roll of Renown honours Australian and New Zealander musicians who have shaped the music industry by making a significant and lasting contribution to Country Music. It was inaugurated in 1976 and the inductee is announced at the Country Music Awards of Australia in Tamworth in January.

|-
| 1995
| Ted Egan
| Australian Roll of Renown
|

Country Music Awards of Australia
The Country Music Awards of Australia (CMAA) (also known as the Golden Guitar Awards) is an annual awards night held in January during the Tamworth Country Music Festival, celebrating recording excellence in the Australian country music industry. They have been held annually since 1973.

|-
| 2000
| "The Drover's Boy"
| Video Clip of the Year
| 
|-
| 2014
| Ted Egan
| Lifetime Achievement Award
|

Tamworth Songwriters Awards
The Tamworth Songwriters Association (TSA) is an annual songwriting contest for original country songs, awarded in January at the Tamworth Country Music Festival. They commenced in 1986.
 (wins only)
|-
| 1991
| Ted Egan
| Songmaker Award
| 
|-
|rowspan="2"| 2011
| "Queensland Opera" by Ted Egan
| Comedy/Novelty Song of the Year
| 
|-
| "The Laughing Game" by Ted Egan
| Children's Song of the Year
| 
|-

References

External links
 Egan's official website
 Television interview with Egan (ABC's Enough Rope, August 2004)
 Official Administrator's site
 VIDEO: Egan on the crisis in Indigenous Australia (2009) on ABC Fora

1932 births
Living people
Public servants from Melbourne
Australian folk singers
Administrators of the Northern Territory
Officers of the Order of Australia
Indigenous Australian musicians
Musicians from the Northern Territory
People from Coburg, Victoria